Victor Farrant is a former labourer from Portsmouth, England with convictions for rape, murder and attempted murder. He is serving a life sentence in prison.

Crimes
In 1988, Farrant was convicted of rape, false imprisonment, grievous bodily harm and unlawful wounding. He was sentenced to 12 years in prison, serving seven years and was released in November 1995.

In December 1995, he attacked Mrs Anne Fidler in her home in Eastleigh, Hampshire with three wine bottles and an iron, nearly killing her. She was so badly injured that she had no memory of the attack. She was found in the kitchen by her husband. Mrs Fidler had been working as a prostitute.

Six weeks later he murdered Mrs. Glenda Hoskins, an accountant and former girlfriend, at her home in Port Solent, Portsmouth, Hampshire. He hid her body in the attic, then took her car to Continental Europe. He was arrested in France and returned to Britain to face charges. Mrs Hoskins' teenage daughter found her body. Her three children and former husband survived her.

In January 1998, he was found guilty of attempted murder of Mrs. Fidler and of murder of Mrs. Hoskins. The judge recommended that Victor Farrant never be released. The Farrant family expressed sympathy with the families of his victims.

References

Murder in Hampshire
Criminals from Hampshire
English people convicted of murder
People convicted of murder by England and Wales
English people convicted of rape
Crime in Portsmouth
People from Portsmouth
English prisoners sentenced to life imprisonment
Living people
Year of birth missing (living people)
1996 murders in the United Kingdom
People convicted of attempted murder